USS Onward and USS Onward II have been the name of more than one United States Navy ship, and may refer to:

 , a clipper ship in commission from 1862 to 1865 and again, as a store ship, from 1865 to 1884
 , a patrol vessel in commission from 1917 to 1919
 , a patrol vessel in commission from 1917 to 1918

Onward